Rakai Pikatan was a king of the Sanjaya dynasty Mataram Kingdom in Central Java who built the Prambanan temple, dedicated to Shiva, which was completed in 856 AD. Rakai Pikatan was also called Mpu Manuku.

The monarch of the Mataram Kingdom before Rakai Pikatan was Samaratungga of the Shailendra Dynasty. He had one son, Balaputra, and one daughter, Pramodhawardhani. Rakai Pikatan and the Sanjaya dynasty were Shivaite Hindus and is recorded in the Wantil Inscription as having married a daughter of another religion. This is most likely Pramodhawardhani, the Mahayana Buddhist daughter of Samaratungga.

It's believed that Pikatan fought his brother in law Balaputra, forcing him to move to Srivijaya in 856. Other interpretations based on the Kayumwungan inscription put Balaputra as Pramodhawardhani's uncle rather than her brother as inscriptions only list Pramodhawaradhani as a child of Samaratungga. Hence, Balaputra went to Srivijaya not because of force but because he had no claim as a brother of the monarch. 

According to the interpretation of Loro Jonggrang legend, Pramodhawardhani's likeness was the model for Durga's image in the Prambanan temple.

References 

 Marwati Poesponegoro & Nugroho Notosusanto. 1990. Sejarah Nasional Indonesia Jilid II. Jakarta: Balai Pustaka

Indonesian monarchs
Shailendra dynasty
Central Java
9th-century Indonesian people